El Espino may refer to:
 El Espino, Spain
 El Espino, Panama
 El Espino, Boyacá, Colombia
 El Espino de Santa Rosa, Panama